Dudley West was a parliamentary constituency, centred on the town of Dudley in the West Midlands. It existed from 1974 to 1997, returning one Member of Parliament (MP)  to the House of Commons of the Parliament of the United Kingdom by the first past the post system.

History
The constituency was created for the February 1974 general election, from the old Dudley constituency (which was created following the Reform Act in 1832) along with the Brierley Hill constituency, and abolished for the 1997 general election. It was a 'bellwether' constituency where the winner of each general election throughout its existence matched the party which won the election.

Boundaries
1974–1983: The County Borough of Dudley wards of Brierley Hill, Brockmoor and Pensnett, Gornal, Kingswinford and Wall Heath, Quarry Bank, Sedgley, and Wordsley.

1983–1997: The Metropolitan Borough of Dudley wards of Amblecote, Brierley Hill, Brockmoor and Pensnett, Gornal, Kingswinford North and Wall Heath, Kingswinford South, Sedgley, and Wordsley.

Dudley West was one of three constituencies covering the Metropolitan Borough of Dudley, encompassing the western half of the town of Dudley. The constituency included Brierley Hill, Kingswinford, and parts of Sedgley. At abolition in 1997, both Dudley West and Dudley East were replaced by two new constituencies: Dudley North and Dudley South, with some constituents being transferred to the re-formed Stourbridge constituency.

Members of Parliament

Elections

Elections in the 1970s

Elections in the 1980s

Elections in the 1990s

See also 
 List of parliamentary constituencies in Dudley

Notes and references 

Politics of Dudley
Parliamentary constituencies in the West Midlands (county) (historic)
Constituencies of the Parliament of the United Kingdom established in 1974
Constituencies of the Parliament of the United Kingdom disestablished in 1997